Making Waves: Irving Dardik and His Superwave Principle is a biography of Irving Dardik and his controversial SuperWave principle, which posits the use of wave technology as a viable method of treating diseases. It was written by science writer Roger Lewin and published by Rodale Books in 2005.

References

2005 non-fiction books